Goa Carbon Limited is an Indian petrochemical company and is engaged in the manufacture and sale of Calcined Petroleum Coke. It is a public company listed on the Bombay Stock Exchange and National Stock Exchange and is the second largest producer of Calcined Petroleum Coke in India. Other specialty consumer segments include titanium dioxide and other chemicals. The company's calcination plant is located approximately 40 kilometers from the Mormugoa Port. It was incorporated and established on 22 June 1967. It has manufacturing facilities in Goa, Paradip and Bilaspur. Total capacity is 1,65,000 MT per annum.

Products 
 Calcined Petroleum Coke
 Recarburiser
 Laddle additive
 Carbon raiser

Achievements 
Goa Carbon's plant is ISO 9001:2008 by Bureau Veritas. It is also ISO 14001:2004 certified.

References 

Companies based in Goa
Vedanta Resources
1967 establishments in Goa, Daman and Diu
Indian companies established in 1967
Companies listed on the National Stock Exchange of India
Companies listed on the Bombay Stock Exchange